The 1964 East Carolina Pirates football team was an American football team that represented East Carolina College (now known as East Carolina University) as an independent during the 1964 NCAA College Division football season. In their third season under head coach Clarence Stasavich, the team compiled a 9–1 record.

Schedule

References

East Carolina
East Carolina Pirates football seasons
Citrus Bowl champion seasons
East Carolina Pirates football